Tammany or Tamanend was a Native American leader.

Tammany or Tamanend may also refer to:
Mount Tammany, a mountain on the New Jersey/Pennsylvania border
Tammany Hall, political organization in New York
Tammany (Williamsport, Maryland), a house on the National Register of Historic Places
Tammany (horse), a racehorse owned by Marcus Daly
Tammany Young (1886–1936), American actor
Tamanend, Pennsylvania, an unincorporated community
Tamanend Middle School, Warrington, Pennsylvania

See also
Tammanies or Tammany Societies, American fraternal organizations 
St. Tammany Parish, Louisiana
Tammany Trace, trail in St. Tammany parish